Teleogramma obamaorum is a species of African cichlid native to the Congo River. Unlike other species of Teleogramma, sexes lack color differences in the caudal (tail) fin. Individuals reach up to  SL, and prey mainly on snails.

Teleogramma obamaorum was described in 2015 and named in honor of U.S. president Barack Obama and first lady Michelle Obama in recognition of their commitments to science conservation, and development in Africa and abroad.

See also
 List of things named after Barack Obama
 List of organisms named after famous people (born 1950–present)

References

Chromidotilapiini
Taxa named by Melanie Stiassny
Cichlid fish of Africa
Fish described in 2015
Species named after Barack Obama
Endemic fauna of the Democratic Republic of the Congo